Yohan de Silva (born 14 April 1985) is a Sri Lankan first-class cricketer. He made his List A debut for Bloomfield Cricket and Athletic Club in the 2004–05 Premier Limited Overs Tournament on 21 August 2004. He made his Twenty20 debut for Bloomfield Cricket and Athletic Club on 3 September 2004. He made his first-class debut for Bloomfield Cricket and Athletic Club in the 2005–06 Premier Trophy on 29 December 2005.

References

External links
 

1985 births
Living people
Sri Lankan cricketers
Bloomfield Cricket and Athletic Club cricketers
Nondescripts Cricket Club cricketers
Polonnaruwa District cricketers
Sri Lanka Ports Authority Cricket Club cricketers
People from Anuradhapura